Hind Hind Legs is an album released by Montreal-based indie band The Lovely Feathers by Equator Records on April 18, 2006 (see 2006 in music).

Track listing
 "Pope John Paul"
 "In The Valley"
 "I Really Like You"
 "Frantic"
 "Wrong Choice"
 "Mildly Decorated"
 "Photocorners"
 "The Only Appalachian Cornfield"
 "Ooh You Shocked Me"
 "E Man Sorrow"
 "Rod Stewart"
 "Breakfast Cake"
 "Lion Eats the Wildebeest"

Personnel
Mark Kupfert - Vocals, Guitar

Richard Yonofsky - Vocals, Guitar, Entertainment

Noah Bernamoff - Bass

Daniel Suss - Keyboard, Vocals

Ted Suss - Drums

External links

2006 albums
The Lovely Feathers albums